Lucas Bernard is a financial economist and chairman of the Business Department at The New York City College of Technology. City Tech, as it is known, is part of The City University of New York and is the largest public, undergraduate college of technology in the Northeastern United States. He grew up in New York City, the son of playwright Kenneth Bernard and Elaine Ceil Reiss.

Prof. Bernard's recent research has moved away from the traditional mathematical models,   popular with economists, and more towards the role of economics as a sub-discipline of sociology. Bernard is interested in the ways in which economics blends together human values, politics, rationality and irrationality; more specifically, how this interplay reveals itself in society at large.   He is an Advisory Editor in Economics and Finance for Oxford University Press.

His doctoral dissertation, concerning endogenous models of credit default, was written at The New School for Social Research under Willi Semmler.  He also holds graduate degrees in both Mathematics (City University of New York) and Computer Science (NYU's Courant Institute).

References

Financial economists
The New School alumni
The New School faculty
City University of New York faculty
Living people
Courant Institute of Mathematical Sciences alumni
City University of New York alumni
Year of birth missing (living people)